Dwayne D. Umbarger (August 2, 1952) is a former Republican member of the Kansas Senate, representing the 14th district from 1997 until 2013.  He has been the Assistant Majority Whip since 2003.  In 1995 and 1996, he was on the ANW Special Education Board in Numbolt, Kansas.  He was also a School Board member for the Consolidated Unified School District #101 in Erie from 1994 to 1996.

Committee assignments
Sen. Umbarger serves on these legislative committees:
 Transportation (chair)
 Joint Committee on State Building Construction (vice-chair)
 Joint Committee on Arts and Cultural Resources
 Education
 Joint Committee on Home and Community Based Services Oversight
 Judiciary
 Joint Committee on Legislative Post Audit
 Organization, Calendar and Rules
 Ways and Means

Major donors
Some of the top contributors to Marshall's 2008 campaign, according to the National Institute on Money in State Politics:
 Kansas Republican Senatorial Committee, Kansas Association of Realtors, American Federation of State, County and Municipal Employees, Kansas National Education Association, Kansas Dental Association

Health care companies were his largest donor group.

References

External links
Kansas Senate
Project Vote Smart profile
 Follow the Money campaign contributions
 1996, 1998, 2000, 2002, 2004, 2006, 2008
 Sen. Umbarger on Vote KS.org

Republican Party Kansas state senators
Living people
1952 births
Pittsburg State University alumni
Neosho County Community College alumni
20th-century American politicians
21st-century American politicians